Vermontville is a village in Eaton County in the U.S. state of Michigan. The population was 759 at the 2010 census. It is located within Vermontville Township.  Vermontville is home to the original maple syrup festival in Michigan, held the last full weekend in April.

Vermontville is served by Maple Valley Schools.

History
The Village of Vermontville was organized in 1836 by the Reverend Sylvester Cochrane, a Congregational minister from East Poultney, Vermont and the Union Colony. The village was incorporated on March 11, 1871, by an act of the Legislature.

The Village of Vermontville is served by the Vermontville Township Public Library, which opened its doors on opened February 12, 1949.  The library is located on the first floor of the Opera House.

The Fire Department was established in 1836 with a cooperative effort between the Village of Vermontville and Vermontville Township.  It is now under the control of the Township.

Vermontville Academy & Museum (erected 1844 owned by Vermontville First Congregational Church; original First Congregational Church)

Vermontville Opera House (erected 1893 or 1896; completed 1898 by Village of Vermontville and Vermontville Township; joint ownership)

Vermontville First Congregational Church (erected 1864)

Vermontville United Methodist Church (erected 1862 / moved to Village of Vermontville 1877)

Geography

Weather

Vermontville Maple Syrup Festival
Vermontville is home to the original maple syrup festival in Michigan held the last full weekend in April. In 2011, the festival was held on April 29, 30, and May 1. This was because Easter fell on Sunday of the last full weekend that year. The festival was proposed one day during a conversation at a local barber shop in 1940, with the idea of promoting the village.

Queen and Court 
Currently, all young women in their junior year (grade 11) at Maple Valley Schools are eligible to compete for the title of Vermontville Maple Syrup Festival Queen and her court.  The festival is held the last full weekend in April.

Recreation/Parks
Vermontville contains three public parks:
In the center of the Village as part of the Public Square.  A Vietnam Veteran's memorial is located here.  This park includes playground equipment and picnic tables.
Third Street at the Water Tower lot.  This park includes 1 pee wee ball field, 1 T-ball field, playground equipment, picnic pavilion, and basketball court.
East First Street.  This park is used by a Youth Baseball League in May and June and is available the remainder of the time.  This park contains a ball field.
The town is the terminus of the Paul Henry–Thornapple Rail Trail.
A Conservation District park has a canoe/kayak launch with benches and parking at Mason Road and the Thornapple River behind the High School.

Notable residents
Homer G. Barber (1830–1909), Michigan state senator
Duane Hawkins (1840–1899), Michigan state representative

Demographics

2010 census
As of the census of 2010, there were 759 people, 291 households, and 199 families residing in the village. The racial makeup of the village was 97.1% White, 0.8% Native American, 0.3% Asian, and 1.8% from two or more races. Hispanic or Latino of any race were 2.4% of the population.

There were 291 households, of which 36.4% had children under the age of 18 living with them, 50.5% were married couples living together, 10.3% had a female householder with no husband present, 7.6% had a male householder with no wife present, and 31.6% were non-families. 25.4% of all households were made up of individuals, and 13% had someone living alone who was 65 years of age or older. The average household size was 2.61 and the average family size was 3.06.

The median age in the village was 36.3 years. 26.2% of residents were under the age of 18; 8.6% were between the ages of 18 and 24; 25.9% were from 25 to 44; 25% were from 45 to 64; and 14.1% were 65 years of age or older. The gender makeup of the village was 52.2% male and 47.8% female.

2000 census
As of the census of 2000, there were 789 people, 287 households, and 216 families residing in the village. The racial makeup of the village was 97.21% White, 0.76% Native American, 0.25% Asian, 0.25% from other races, and 1.52% from two or more races. Hispanic or Latino of any race were 0.51% of the population. 23.5% were of German, 17.8% English, 15.1% American, 7.8% Dutch and 6.5% Irish ancestry according to Census 2000.

There were 287 households, out of which 41.5% had children under the age of 18 living with them, 55.7% were married couples living together, 13.2% had a female householder with no husband present, and 24.7% were non-families. 20.6% of all households were made up of individuals, and 9.8% had someone living alone who was 65 years of age or older.  The average household size was 2.73 and the average family size was 3.14.

In the village, the population was spread out, with 33.2% under the age of 18, 5.8% from 18 to 24, 30.0% from 25 to 44, 20.4% from 45 to 64, and 10.5% who were 65 years of age or older.  The median age was 33 years. For every 100 females, there were 92.4 males.  For every 100 females age 18 and over, there were 87.5 males.

The median income for a household in the village was $40,441, and the median income for a family was $43,393. Males had a median income of $40,625 versus $25,156 for females. The per capita income for the village was $17,582.  About 7.0% of families and 9.7% of the population were below the poverty line, including 10.2% of those under age 18 and 12.9% of those age 65 or over.

References

External links
Official Website of the Village of Vermontville
Vermontville Maple Syrup Festival, Home of the Original Maple Syrup Festival in Michigan
Official Website of Vermontville Township

Villages in Eaton County, Michigan
Villages in Michigan
Lansing–East Lansing metropolitan area
Populated places established in 1836
1836 establishments in Michigan Territory